Teenage Catgirls in Heat (originally titled Catgirls) is a 1993 comedy film co-written and directed by Scott Perry and distributed by Troma Entertainment.

Plot
The film is set in a small town, where an Egyptian cat god manifests in the form of a cheap statue. He turns cats into human women, and directs them to procreate with and thereafter kill human men, and take over the world. Ralph, a bumbling hitchhiker, and Warren, a "cat exterminator", join forces against the cats, but Ralph inadvertently falls for Cleo, one of the cats turned into human form.

Production
Teenage Catgirls in Heat was filmed in Austin, Texas.

Reception
Marc Savlov for The Austin Chronicle gave the film one star out of 5. He found the dialogue bad, and the violence "cheesy". Richard Propes of The Independent Critic gave it a grade of A−, calling it "the ultimate B-movie." Film critic Joe Bob Briggs gave it four stars and called it a "pretty decent [film]". TV Guide rated the film at two out of four stars, stating that "this is one of the better independent films to be released on video by Troma. Unfortunately, this genial parody eventually sinks under the constraints of a miniscule [sic] budget." Joe Kane in Phantom of the Movies' Videoscope, said the film "happily lives up to its madcap moniker", giving it three stars out of four and praising the script and actors' performances.

References

External links

1993 films
1990s sex comedy films
American independent films
Troma Entertainment films
1990s English-language films
American sex comedy films
Films set in Texas
Films shot in Austin, Texas
Teen sex comedy films
1993 comedy films
1990s American films